The National Union for the Progress of Romania (UNPR) is a political party in Romania. The party was formed in March 2010 by independents who had broken away from the Social Democratic Party (PSD) and the National Liberal Party (PNL) to support President Traian Băsescu. Tension began soon after the party's formation between former PSD and PNL members over the distribution of leadership positions and the political direction of the new party, with former PSD members dominating. The first party congress to elect its leaders was on 1 May 2010.

On 12 July 2016, former President Traian Băsescu announced that UNPR would merge with his People's Movement Party (PMP) on 20 July 2016, but the process failed and Gabriel Oprea reorganised the party in June 2018. At the PMP congress in March 2021, PMP members formally denounced and dissolved their former union with UNPR.

History 

In 2009, parliamentarians from PSD, PNL, and other parliamentary organizations left their political parties to support President Traian Băsescu. Thus, they formed the parliamentary group of independents, led by former senator Gabriel Oprea. Afterwards, Oprea was named Minister of Administration and Interior.

In 2010, the majority of the group formed UNPR. On 1 May 2010, the new party elected its leaders, by means of congress. Allied with the PDL and UDMR, the UNPR participated in government until 2012. At the first party congress held in May 2010, Marian Sârbu was elected president. In 2011, the National Initiative Party (PIN) merged into the Union. PIN's president, Lavinia Șandru, became UNPR's vice-president but later resigned from the party citing its lack of support for her ecologist policies.

In 2012, the government led by independent Mihai Răzvan Ungureanu was dismissed by a motion of no confidence and, as such, the UNPR entered parliamentary opposition. On 28 May 2012, Sârbu stepped down as party leader. Following Sârbu's resignation, Gabriel Oprea was elected UNPR president. UNPR later formed with PSD, the Centre Left Alliance (ACS) which was included in the Social Liberal Union (USL).

Cristian Diaconescu, a founding member of UNPR, honorary president, and former Minister of External Affairs, resigned from the union after the party changed sides and entered the Social Liberal Union (USL). He is an independent politician with close ties to the right-wing conservative former President of Romania, Traian Băsescu, who appointed him as leader of the Presidential Chancellery in March 2012.

In the Romanian Parliamentary elections of December 2012, the UNPR won in alliance (i.e. USL) with the PSD, PNL, and PC, 10 seats in the Chamber of Deputies and 5 in the Senate. Because the party lacked the necessary number of seats to form a distinct parliamentary group (12 deputies and 7 senators respectively), their parliamentarians joined the group of the Social Democratic Party (PSD). They voted for the government led by former PSD Prime Minister Victor Ponta. Oprea served as Deputy Prime Minister of Romania between 2012 and 2015.

On 29 June 2015, the party absorbed the People's Party – Dan Diaconescu (PP-DD) in aftermath of Diaconescu's conviction of extortion.

Doctrine 

UNPR's doctrine is social-democratic with shades of progressivism. The union is against right-wing politics policies, both conservative and neo-conservative. The union's self reported doctrine is "progressive left-wing" with a social-democratic orientation. UNPR believes in a new political and economic order, based on consolidation of the market economy within an "active state" that protects citizens and human rights. UNPR strongly supports a significant wealth tax and fair progressive taxation. UNPR's platform also includes support for the decentralization of Romania.

Structure 

The president acts as the union's governing body; he represents the party in political conversations and parliament. The president has large powers in the union and is helped by the standing Bureau of the Union.

Leadership 

 Gabriel Oprea -  president (former vice-prime-minister)
 Titu Bojin - vice-president 
 Nuțu Fonta - secretary general

Electoral history

Legislative elections 

Notes:

1 The USL was an electoral and political alliance composed of two other smaller alliances as follows: the Centre Left Alliance (ACS) and the Centre Right Alliance (ACD). The members of the Centre Left Alliance were the PSD (with 58 senators and 149 deputies) and the UNPR (with 5 senators and 10 deputies). On the other hand, the members of the Centre Right Alliance were the PNL (with 51 senators and 101 deputies), and the PC (with 8 senators and 13 deputies).

2 In July 2016, the UNPR merged with the PMP. The merger was revoked in June 2018 and officially denounced by the PMP at their latest congress in March 2021.

3 After the merger with the PMP was revoked and the party was reinstated.

Presidential elections 

Notes:

1 Victor Ponta was a member of PSD, but was endorsed by an electoral alliance consisting of the PSD, the UNPR, and the PC.

European elections 

Notes:

1 Social Democractic Union (USD) members: PSD (12 MEPs), PC (2 MEPs), and UNPR.

See also 

 Politics of Romania
 List of political parties in Romania

References

External links 

 Official Website of the National Union for the Progress of Romania
 Câmpanu: The National Union for the Advancement of Romania will enter the court next week 
 Gabriel Oprea - UNPR pornește de la seven la sută 
 Tension among independents

2010 establishments in Romania
Political parties established in 2010
Pro-European political parties in Romania
Progressive parties
Social democratic parties in Romania